Ted W. Lieu (born March 29, 1969) is an American attorney, politician and retired military officer  who has represented California's 36th congressional district in the U.S. House of Representatives since 2023. He represented the 33rd congressional district from 2015 to 2023. The district includes South Bay and Westside regions of Los Angeles, as well as Beverly Hills, Santa Monica, the Palos Verdes Peninsula, and Beach Cities.

Having emigrated from Taiwan at age 3, Lieu is one of 18 members of Congress who are naturalized U.S. citizens. He represented the 28th district in the California State Senate from 2011 to 2014, after being elected to fill the seat of deceased Senator Jenny Oropeza. From 2005 to 2010 he was a California State Assemblyman, representing the 53rd district, after being elected to fill the seat of deceased Assemblyman Mike Gordon.

Lieu served on active duty with the United States Air Force Judge Advocate General's Corps from 1995 to 1999. From 2000 to 2021 he served in the Air Force Reserve Command, and he attained the rank of colonel in 2015. House Democratic Leader Nancy Pelosi appointed Lieu Assistant whip of the 115th Congress in 2017. He has been Vice Chair of the House Democratic Caucus since 2023.

Early life and education 
Lieu was born in Taipei, Taiwan. At age three, he immigrated with his family to Cleveland, Ohio. In 1987, he graduated from Saint Ignatius High School.

In 1991, Lieu earned a Bachelor of Science in computer science and Bachelor of Arts in political science from Stanford University. While there, he became a member of Sigma Alpha Mu fraternity. He went on to Georgetown University Law Center, receiving a Juris Doctor degree and graduating magna cum laude in 1994. At law school, Lieu was the editor-in-chief of the Georgetown Law Journal, and received four American Jurisprudence awards.

Early career 
Lieu served as a law clerk to Judge Thomas Tang of the United States Court of Appeals for the Ninth Circuit.

Lieu joined the United States Air Force in 1995 and served four years on active duty as a member of the Judge Advocate General's Corps. As a military prosecutor and adviser to commanders, he has received various awards and medals for his service, both abroad and locally, including the Meritorious Service Medal with one Oak Leaf Cluster, the Air Force Commendation Medal, and the Humanitarian Service Medal. Lieu served in the Air Force Reserve from 2000 to 2021, and he was promoted to colonel in December 2015.

Torrance City Council
On March 5, 2002, Lieu was elected to the Torrance City Council alongside Mike Mauno and Pat McIntyre. On April 9, they were sworn in to replace outgoing members Marcia Cribb, Jack Messerlian, and Dan Walker, who had been elected mayor. Lieu served until his election to the state assembly, and was succeeded by Rod Guyton via appointment.

California State Legislature

California Assembly
Lieu won a September 13, 2005, special election to fill the 53rd Assembly district following the death of incumbent Mike Gordon. Lieu defeated three Republicans, including physician Mary Jo Ford and fellow Torrance City Councilman Paul Nowatka.

Lieu was reelected in 2006 and again in 2008.

Lieu was chair of the Assembly Rules Committee. He was a member of the Assembly Governmental Organization Committee, Assembly Judiciary Committee and Assembly Veterans Affairs Committee. Lieu was also chair of the Asian Pacific Islander Legislative Caucus and chair of the Assembly Select Committee on Aerospace. In 2014 he joined the newly founded Friends of Wales Caucus.

In 2008, in a surprising turn of events in the Ladies Professional Golf Association (LPGA) English language controversy, Lieu and State Senator Leland Yee of San Francisco were able to help rescind the LPGA Tour Commission's suspension-penalty policy for players who failed to learn enough English to speak to sponsors and at award ceremonies. Both officials publicly challenged the legality and galvanized community attention to the LPGA's policy in August 2008 when it was released, which resulted in revision of the policy by the end of 2008.

Lieu is a strong supporter of expansion of public transit in West Los Angeles, LAX, and the South Bay.

Lieu coauthored a successful bill to bypass environmental quality regulations to build a football stadium in Los Angeles. The bill was intended to help the efforts of developer Edward P. Roski persuade the National Football League to return to the city, and was controversial among many environmentalists and legislators. Further controversy ensued when it was announced that Roski had given over $500,000 to political campaigns, including $13,000 to Lieu's.

Legislation
As an Assemblyman, Lieu authored laws in the areas of public safety, child sex offenders, domestic violence, the environment, education, health care, veterans' issues and transportation.

Some of his legislative actions include the following:
AB 1900 helps prevent convicted child sex offenders from working with children (Chapter 340, Statutes of 2006)
ABx2 7, the California Foreclosure Prevention Act, requires lenders to operate a comprehensive home loan modification program or face a 90-day foreclosure moratorium. This is the first law of its kind in the nation (Chapter 5, Statutes of 2009)
AB 2052 allows a victim of domestic violence to break a rental lease if the victim provides a police report or temporary restraining order to the landlord (Chapter 440, Statutes of 2008)
AB 86 gives school districts the ability to discipline students who engage in cyberbullying (Chapter 646, Statutes of 2008)
AB 800 requires reporting of sewage spills, thereby allowing the local public safety officials to close down beaches and public areas affected by such spills (Chapter 371, Statutes of 2007)
AB 236 mandates the state to prioritize the purchase of fleet cars to enhance fuel efficiency and carbon reduction, and requires alternative-fuel-capable vehicles to use alternative fuels (Chapter 593, Statutes of 2007)
AB 392 requires employers to give spouses of Armed Forces members returning from deployment two weeks of unpaid leave if requested by the spouse (Chapter 361, Statutes of 2007) and
AB 1150 bans health insurance companies from providing financial incentives to their employees for terminating health care coverage of patients (Chapter 188, Statutes of 2008).

Run for Attorney General of California
Lieu sought the Democratic nomination in the 2010 California Attorney General election. He finished fourth in the June primary, which was won by future Vice President Kamala Harris.

California Senate
Lieu won a February 15, 2011, special election to fill the 28th Senate district following the death of incumbent Jenny Oropeza. He defeated four Republicans, one Democrat, and two independents.

On January 30, 2014, Senator Lieu voted in favor of California Senate Constitutional Amendment 5. The proposed bill asked California voters to repeal provisions of Proposition 209 and permit state universities to consider an applicant's race, ethnicity or national origin in making admissions decisions. After hearing strong opposition to the bill from Asian-American community, Lieu, along with Senators Leland Yee and Carol Liu, who had also voted for the bill, jointly issued a statement on February 27 calling for the bill to be withheld pending further consultations with the "affected communities."

U.S. House of Representatives

2014 election

Lieu was the Democratic candidate for the 33rd congressional district, formerly represented by Henry Waxman, who retired in 2014 after 40 years in Congress. The 2010 redistricting placed a portion of Torrance, including Lieu's home, in the 33rd.

Lieu placed second in the June primary, but defeated Republican Elan Carr in the general election. He and Waxman are the only persons to represent this district since its creation in 1974 (it was the 24th from 1975 to 1993, the 29th from 1993 to 2003, the 30th from 2003 to 2013, and has been the 33rd since 2013).

Legislation
Lieu successfully passed three laws in the 114th Congress, securing $35 million in funding to the West Los Angeles VA for seismic retrofits; reauthorizing the Advisory Committee on Homeless Veterans; and restoring the Quarterly Financial Report. Lieu also introduced the Climate Solutions Act in the 114th Congress, which aimed to model national energy goals and climate emissions reduction targets after the state of California.

In the 115th Congress Lieu introduced H.R. 669 – Restricting First Use of Nuclear Weapons Act of 2017, which would prohibit the president from using the Armed Forces to conduct a first-use nuclear strike unless such strike is conducted pursuant to a congressional declaration of war expressly authorizing such strike.

On March 8, 2017, Lieu introduced H.R. 1437 – No Money Bail Act of 2017. The bill proposes eliminating the money bail system for holding suspects in pretrial proceedings.

Tenure
Lieu is one of two Taiwanese American members of the 114th United States Congress, along with New York's Grace Meng.

He was voted Democratic Freshman Class President of the House by his colleagues, succeeding Joaquín Castro. Lieu serves on two influential committees in Congress: the House Judiciary Committee and the House Foreign Affairs Committee.

Lieu voted against the Iran deal.

Lieu received praise from the online privacy community when he introduced bipartisan legislation to prevent states from forcing companies to weaken encryption for law enforcement purposes.

On September 16, 2015, Lieu and Justin Amash introduced a bill to reduce funding for the Drug Enforcement Administration's Cannabis Eradication Program, under which real estate and chattels can be seized if they have been used for marijuana trafficking and abuse.

On July 22 it was announced that Lieu would speak at the 2016 Democratic National Convention, along with three other California House Democrats.

On November 6, 2017, while the House of Representatives chambers was holding a moment of silence was held for the 26 victims of a church shooting in Texas, Lieu filmed and posted a video message calling for gun law reform. Lieu said, "I’ve been to too many moments of silences. In just my short career in Congress, three of the worst mass shootings in U.S. history have occurred. I will not be silent. What we need is we need action. We need to pass gun safety legislation now."

Lieu is a member of the Congressional Progressive Caucus.

On April 25, 2018, 57 members of the House of Representatives, including Lieu, released a condemnation of Holocaust distortion in Ukraine and Poland. They criticized Poland's new Holocaust law, which would criminalize accusing Poland of complicity in the Holocaust, and Ukraine's 2015 memory laws glorifying Ukrainian Insurgent Army (UPA) and its leaders, such as Roman Shukhevych.

In 2019, Lieu signed a letter led by Representative Ro Khanna and Senator Rand Paul to President Trump asserting that it is "long past time to rein in the use of force that goes beyond congressional authorization" and that they hoped this would "serve as a model for ending hostilities in the future—in particular, as you and your administration seek a political solution to our involvement in Afghanistan."

In December 2019, an attorney for congressman Devin Nunes sent a letter to Lieu threatening to sue over Lieu's comments about Nunes's relationship with Ukrainian-born American businessman Lev Parnas. In response, Lieu wrote, "I welcome any lawsuit from your client and look forward to taking discovery of Congressman Nunes. Or, you can take your letter and shove it."

In October 2020, Lieu co-signed a letter to Secretary of State Mike Pompeo that condemned Azerbaijan’s offensive operations against the Armenian-populated enclave of Nagorno-Karabakh, denounced Turkey’s role in the Nagorno-Karabakh conflict, and called for an immediate ceasefire.

On January 12, 2021, Lieu was named an impeachment manager for the second impeachment of President Trump.

Committee assignments
Committee on the Judiciary
Subcommittee on Intellectual Property, and the Internet
Subcommittee on Crime Terrorism, Homeland Security, and Investigations
Committee on Foreign Affairs
Subcommittee on Middle East and North Africa

Caucus memberships
 House Baltic Caucus
Congressional Arts Caucus
Congressional Asian Pacific American Caucus (Whip)
Veterinary Medicine Caucus
U.S.-Japan Caucus
Friends of Wales Caucus
Medicare for All Caucus
Congressional Progressive Caucus
Congressional Direct Selling Caucus

Campaign donations to Stanford University 
From 2016 to 2018, Lieu made four donations totaling $51,046 from his campaign account to his alma mater, Stanford University. In 2020 Stanford admitted Lieu's eldest son, Brennan. National Review and The Washington Examiner raised questions about the propriety of the donations. An opinion writer for The Examiner noted that other members of Congress have donated to universities and asserted, "Lieu's $50,000 to Stanford is the second-largest contribution on record from an active congressional candidate to a college or university." Former FEC chairman Bradley Smith told the Review that donations to universities from campaign funds were not improper and "It's actually relatively common for congressmen, especially senators who might have big campaign funds built up, to give a bunch of money to their alma mater."  In 2012–13, parental donations needed to be at least $500,000 (nearly ten times the amount of Lieu's donations) before a student would appear on the list the Office of Development provided to the Stanford admission office.

Political positions

Abortion
Lieu describes himself as "100% pro-choice." As of 2022, he has a 100% rating from NARAL Pro-Choice America and an F rating from the Susan B. Anthony List for his abortion-related voting record. Lieu opposed the Supreme Court decision overturning of Roe v. Wade.

Civil rights and social justice

Banning sexual orientation conversion therapy 

In 2012, Lieu authored a bill that bans the provision of sexual orientation change efforts (including conversion therapy) to minors. This bill passed both the State Assembly and Senate with substantial support, and was signed into law by Governor Jerry Brown in 2012. This made California the first U.S. state to have such a ban. Several other states and the District of Columbia have followed in enacting bans on sexual orientation change efforts with minors. As U.S. Representative, Lieu has introduced the Therapeutic Fraud Prevention Act, a bill for a federal ban on conversion therapy, following statements by President Obama opposing the practice.

Foreign affairs

Criticism of U.S. support for Saudi Arabia 

Lieu has been publicly raising concerns over U.S. support for Saudi Arabian-led intervention in Yemen. In March 2016 he sent a letter to Secretary of State John Kerry and Secretary of Defense Ash Carter. Lieu wrote in the letter that the "apparent indiscriminate airstrikes on civilian targets in Yemen seem to suggest that either the coalition is grossly negligent in its targeting or is intentionally targeting innocent civilians. ... Some of these strikes look like war crimes to me, and I want to get answers as to why the U.S. appears to be assisting in the execution of war crimes in Yemen."

In April 2017 Lieu again criticized U.S. involvement in Saudi Arabian military campaign in Yemen, highlighting that Al Qaeda in Yemen "has emerged as a de facto ally of the Saudi-led militaries with whom [Trump] administration aims to partner more closely."

Foreign espionage 

In 2015, Lieu called for a Justice Department investigation into the arrests of several Chinese-American scientists for espionage. On February 13, 2018, in a Senate Select Committee on Intelligence hearing focused on Chinese espionage in the United States, Senator Marco Rubio asked FBI Director Christopher A. Wray about the risk posed by China's students in advanced science and mathematics programs. Lieu criticized Wray's response as "irresponsible generalizations" implying that all Chinese students and scholars were spies.

Immigration
On June 22, 2018, Lieu played an audio clip of children taken from their parents under the Trump administration family separation policy crying and calling for their parents. Karen Handel, Republican representative from Georgia, who was presiding over the session, called on Lieu to stop playing the clip, citing a rule (House Rule 17) that prohibits persons on the floor of the House from using "a mobile electronic device that impairs decorum." Lieu responded, "Why are we hiding this from the American people? I think the American people need to hear this."

Personal life 

Lieu and his wife Betty Lieu (a former California Deputy Attorney General) reside in Torrance, California, with their two sons, Brennan and Austin. Lieu is a practicing Catholic.

Before Donald Trump's Twitter account was permanently suspended, Lieu was known for rebutting Trump's tweets on his personal account, @tedlieu. "I just decided that if Donald Trump was going to say 27 crazy, misleading things a week, I am going to point out that he said 27 crazy, misleading things, and to not allow him to get away with it", Lieu said. He continues to use his Twitter account to express his political views.

See also
 List of Asian Americans and Pacific Islands Americans in the United States Congress
 Taiwanese Americans in Los Angeles

References

External links

Congressman Ted Lieu official U.S. House website
Ted Lieu for Congress campaign website
 
 

|-

|-

|-

|-

|-

|-

1969 births
21st-century American politicians
American military lawyers
American military personnel of Chinese descent
American politicians of Taiwanese descent
California city council members
California lawyers
Democratic Party California state senators
Catholics from California
Georgetown University Law Center alumni
United States Air Force Judge Advocate General's Corps
Living people
Democratic Party members of the California State Assembly
Democratic Party members of the United States House of Representatives from California
Asian-American members of the United States House of Representatives
Military personnel from California
People from Torrance, California
Politicians from Cleveland
Recipients of the Meritorious Service Medal (United States)
Stanford University alumni
Taiwanese emigrants to the United States
United States Air Force officers
Members of the United States Congress of Chinese descent
Articles containing video clips
Politicians from Taipei
California politicians of Chinese descent
Naturalized citizens of the United States
American LGBT rights activists
United States Air Force reservists
American Roman Catholics